Tây Trà is a former district (huyện) of Quảng Ngãi province in the South Central Coast region of Vietnam. As of 2003 the district had a population of 14,904. The district covers an area of 337 km². The district capital lies at Trà Phong.

The district was formed in 2003 from a portion of Trà Bồng district, and was reannexed by Trà Bồng District on January 10, 2020.

References

Former districts of Vietnam